Palaeopolis, Palaiopolis, or Paleopolis, rarely spelled Palaepolis (Παλαίπολις), can refer to the cities:

in Italy 
 the original site of the Greek colony in Italy that became Neapolis, now Naples

in Turkey 
 Palaeapolis (Caria), now in Turkey
 Palaeopolis (Lydia), now in Turkey
 Palaeopolis in Pamphylia, now Akören (in Adana province?) in Turkey
 Palaeopolis, the previous name of the Seleucia Pieria

in Greece 
 Palaiopoli, Andros, in the Cyclades Islands (Greece)
 Palaeopolis, a ruined ancient city on the Greek island of Samothrace in the northern Aegean Sea
 Palaeopolis, an ancient Greek settlement on the island Sant Martí d'Empúries, modern Spain
 Palaeopolis, Corfu, within the estate of Mon Repos on the Ionian Island of Corfu